Celeste Jeanne Yarnall (July 26, 1944 – October 7, 2018) was an American actress primarily of the 1960s and 1970s. She started her career on television before moving to feature film roles.

Career
A native of Long Beach, California, Yarnall was discovered by Ozzie Nelson and his son Ricky in 1962  and appeared on their show The Adventures of Ozzie & Harriet. She was named Miss Rheingold 1964 (the last person to hold that title) while modeling and appearing in TV commercials. She made her film debut in The Nutty Professor (1963) and, after appearing at the 1967 Cannes Film Festival, was spotted by producer Harry Alan Towers, who scouted her to appear as the central character in his film Eve. She also appeared as a "Scream Queen" who is terrorized by a headless monster in the horror film Beast of Blood (1971).

Yarnall was known for her role as Yeoman Martha Landon in the Star Trek: The Original Series episode "The Apple" (1967), a character she would return to in the fan-made film Star Trek: Of Gods and Men (2006). She was cast in a small role opposite Elvis Presley in Live a Little, Love a Little (1968), as a party-goer wearing a glittery silver mini-dress and briefly a white fur coat, who captures Presley's attention and prompts him to sing "A Little Less Conversation". After she attended the Cannes Film Festival in 1968, the National Association of Theatre Owners named her "Most Promising New Star" for 1968, and the Foreign Press Corps named her "Most Photogenic Beauty of the Year". In 1971, she starred as the titular vampire in Stephanie Rothman's low-budget film The Velvet Vampire, of which Dave Kehr of the Chicago Reader said, "Given the genre (horror) and the budget (extremely low), it may seem perverse to say that Stephanie Rothman's 1971 film is among the best women's films ever made, but so it is."

Personal life
Yarnall was married to Sheldon Silverstein from 1964 until 1970, with Silverstein, she had her only child, a daughter, Camilla Yarnall (born 1970), and to Robert Colman from 1979 until 1990. On July 2, 2010, she married British artist Nazim Nazim in Ventura, California.

Later years and death
When her acting career diminished, Yarnall began to work in real estate. Despite warnings about limited opportunities for success, she earned a six-figure income in her first year with a real-estate firm. By 1982, she owned Celeste Yarnall & Associates, which a syndicated columnist described as "one of L.A.'s top office real-estate firms."

In 1998, Yarnall achieved a doctorate in nutrition, following which she taught nutrition at Pacific Western University. She also became a breeder of Tonkinese cats and wrote two books: Natural Dog Care: A Complete Guide to Holistic Care for Dogs and Natural Cat Care: A Complete Guide to Holistic Care for Cats. Yarnall attended Star Trek conventions where she signed autographs for fans.

Yarnall died in Westlake Village, California on October 7, 2018, aged 74, from ovarian cancer, which she had been diagnosed with in 2014.

Filmography

References

External links
 . 
 
 
 

1944 births
2018 deaths
Actresses from Long Beach, California
American television actresses
American film actresses
Deaths from cancer in California
Deaths from ovarian cancer
Burials at Forest Lawn Memorial Park (Glendale)
20th-century American actresses
21st-century American women